Sheikh Muhammad Ikram (Urdu: شیخ محمد اکرام; b. 10 September 1908 – 17 January 1973) better known as S. M. Ikram, was a  Pakistani historian, biographer, and littérateur.  He was member of the Indian Civil Service (which he joined in 1931). In 1947, when Pakistan emerged from British India, Ikram opted for Pakistan and served in the Civil Service of Pakistan. On July 1, 1966, he was appointed as director, Institute of Islamic Culture, Lahore, a position he occupied until his death in 1973, at the age of sixty-four.

Personal life 
S. M. Ikram's parents were from Rasulnagar, a small town in the Wazirabad Sub-Division of Gujranwala District in the Punjab in present-day Pakistan. His father, Sheikh Fazal Kareem, was a Qanungo, a pre-Mughal hereditary office of revenue and judicial administration; his mother  was Sardar Begum. Ikram was the eldest of five brothers and two sisters. Ikram's father wanted to name his son Abdul Qadir, after the name of the editor of the first Urdu language magazine, Makhzan, but his own father (Dasaundi Khan) prevailed to name him after his friend, the assistant editor of Makhzan, "Sheikh Muhammad Ikram". Ikram was married on December 30, 1936, in Gujrat to the elder of two daughters (Zebunnisa and Zeenat) of Mian Mukhtar Nabi ("Mianji"), at the time deputy director, the Punjab Agriculture Department. Ikram's wife passed her matriculation examinations from Delhi, and obtained her B.A. in Persian, English, and History from Kinnaird College for Women, Lahore. At his death in Lahore on January 17, 1973, he was survived by his wife, Zebunnisa (1910–1999), and four children.

Education 
Ikram completed his primary education in Kacha Gojra (located between Faisalabad and Toba Tek Singh); his secondary education, from Mission High School, Wazirabad; his matriculation, in 1924, from Government High School (that later became 
Government Intermediate College), Lyallpur; from where he also passed the Faculty of Arts (F.A.) examinations in 1926. During these four years in Lyallpur (1922–1926) Ikram developed his taste and proficiency in the Persian language and poetry. From Lyallpur he moved to Lahore and graduated from Government College with a B.A. in Persian (cum laude), English, and Economics, in 1928; and an M.A. in English Literature in 1930.

Professional life 
Although a full-time civil servant, S. M. Ikram is more famous for his prolific output as a published writer. 
 After obtaining his M.A. (1930) Ikram appeared for the ICS examinations in January 1931 in Delhi. On selection, he was sent in September to Jesus College, Oxford, for two years (1931–1933). On return from England in October Ikram was posted to various positions in the Bombay Presidency (November 1933 to September 1947). At partition, he opted for Pakistan and after attending an official farewell in Puna on September 18, 1947, he emigrated to Pakistan and took up his official position on September 29, 1947. He taught  at Columbia University in New York (as a visiting professor in 1953–1954, and  visited again in 1958–59 and 1961–62. It was here that he made the transition from literature to history and started writing in English rather than Urdu.

Major works 
A major difficulty in reviewing the works of Ikram arises from the fact that he published interim works which he revised often, in the light of his new findings: correcting mistakes, adding, deleting, and rearranging sections, expanding one volume into two (changing the title of the work in the new edition and reverting to the old title in the next edition). In many cases the revisions were sufficiently major for the original and the revised to be treated as two separate works. A study of these differences is still awaited.

Works in the Urdu language 
In their final versions, S. M. Ikram's major works in Urdu consist of biographies of two major literary figures in Urdu, and his magnum opus, the three-volume intellectual history of Muslim India and Pakistan, comparable in scope and method to Vernon Parrington's Main Currents in American Thought (1927):
 A critical biography of the classical Urdu and Persian poet, Ghālib, in three volumes (that might be called his Ghalib trilogy):
 Hayāt-e Ghālib (The Life of Ghālib, 5th ed. 1957): biography (tazkira)
 Hakīm-e Farzāna (The Wise Philosopher, 5th ed. 1957): criticism (of prose, tabsira; consisting of two sections: Ghālib's literary development, and general discussion)
 Armaghān-e Ghālib (A Ghalib Offering, 3rd ed. c. 1944): critical appreciation (of poetry, intikhāb)
 A counter-biography—a subgenre that has been called "pathography" in our times—of Maulānā Shiblī Nu`mānī, written in response to Maulānā Sayyid Sulaimān Nadvī's Life of Shiblī:
 Biography (Shiblīnāma, 1st ed. 1945/46); and
 A Revised Amended Ed. (Yādgār-e Shiblī, 1971)
 A religious history of Muslim India and Pakistan: 
 Āb-e Kausar (The Water of Kausar), covering the Pre-Mughal (711–1526) period;
 Rūd-e Kausar (The River of Kausar), covering the Mughal period (1526–1800);
 Mauj-e Kausar (The Wave of Kausar), covering the post-Mughal (1800–1947) era.

Works in the English language 
With the birth of Pakistan, Ikram took up his official duties in the Ministry of Information and Broadcasting, and his attentions turned toward nation-building both in his official duties and his personal commitments. 
The result were two books in English that were adapted from Mauj-e Kausar:
 Makers of Pakistan and Modern Muslim India, 1950
 Modern Muslim India and the Birth of Pakistan (1858-1951), 1965

In August 1953 Ikram took leave for one year to take up the position of visiting professor at Columbia University, New York, which he visited again in 1958–59, and 1961–62. At Columbia he encountered an entirely different (non-Muslim, English-speaking) audience and was introduced to professional historians and their methods which, with his sympathy with Islam, facility in the Persian language, familiarity with original sources, and learning acquired over years of reading, writing, and reflecting, he found deficient:
In 1953–54, when I undertook a year's teaching assignment at Columbia University, the need for a book in English, dealing with all aspects of Indo-Muslim history, was forcefully brought home to me. I felt this need particularly with regard to American students who, in the absence of anything better, had to fall back upon Vincent Smith's Oxford History of India or similar compilations.

Ikram's lectures at Columbia were the basis for three books:
 History of Muslim Civilization in India and Pakistan (711–1858 A.D.), 1962;
 A shorter American summary: Muslim Civilization in India, 1964, edited by Professor Embree; and
 An expanded national version: Muslim Rule in India and Pakistan (711-1858 A.D.), 1966

Unfinished works
At the time of his death, Ikram had been working on the draft of two books: one, a candid history written after he had retired and could write freely, entitled A History of Pakistan, 1947–1971, was finished and was to have been published by June 1973; the other, A Biography of Quaid-e-Azam, in which he wished to remedy the gap between the scholarship on Gandhi in India and that on Jinnah in Pakistan, was at an advanced stage of preparation. Unfortunately in the disarray surrounding his death both manuscripts were lost.

Honors and awards 

 MRCAS (London): On the title page of Ghalibnama (1936) the author is listed as "Sheikh Muhammad Ikram, MA, MRCAS (London), ICS, Sub-Divisional Officer, Surat, Bombay Area.
 In January 1964, the Punjab University awarded him an honorary Doctor of Letters (D.Litt. or  Litterarum doctor) degree.
 In 1965, he was also awarded the Sitara-e Imtiaz, a civil award for especially meritorious contribution to the security or national interests of Pakistan, world peace, cultural or other significant public endeavors.
 Shortly thereafter, the government of Iran awarded him Nishan-i Sipas (Order of Merit) for his service to literature.
 In 1971, the government of Pakistan awarded him a Pride of Performance medal, a civil award given to Pakistani citizens in recognition of distinguished merit, for his writings in the field of literature.

List of publications 
The following list is based largely on Moazzamuddin (1994, and 1990).

Works in Urdu
  This consisted of three sections: tazkira (Remembrance), tabsira (Criticism), intikhāb (Selections).
 
 
 
 
 
 
  Revised ed. 1977, published posthumously with preface by Ahmad Nadeem Qasmi, Lahore: Idāra-e Saqāfat-e Islāmiya (Institute of Islamic Culture).
 
 
  4th ed. 1958.
 
 
 
 
  Pseudonymous.
  2nd ed. 1967.

Works in Persian
  2nd ed. 1953; Tehran: Nashir Kanun Ma`arafat, 3rd ed. 1954, and Lahore: Combine Printers, Bilal Ganj, 3rd ed. c. 1971; Karachi: Idāra-e Matbū`āt Pakistan, 4th ed. 1959.
  Urdu tr. Khwaja Abdul Hameed Yazdani, Lahore: Majlis-e Taraqqī-e Adab, 1966.

Works in English
  Pseudonymous.
  An unauthorized reprint of this work enjoys wide circulation with the title Indian Muslims and Partition of India (New Delhi: Atlantic Publishers & Distributors, 1992); available on Google Books.

Notes

References 

 
 
 
 
  Cited in Moazzamuddin, Life, 16.
 
 
  2nd ed. 1929. An Urdu translation by Syed Mueenuddin Qureshi appeared in 1932.
 
 
  Originally presented as the author's Ph.D. Thesis, Department of Urdu, Aligarh Muslim University, 1994; page numbers cited refer to the thesis.

External links

Muslim Civilization in India, by S. M. Ikram, ed. A. T. Embree (full text at Columbia University website)

1908 births
1973 deaths
Pakistani civil servants
Pakistani biographers
Historians of Pakistan
20th-century Pakistani historians
Indian Civil Service (British India) officers
Recipients of the Pride of Performance